Chaudhry Altaf Hussain (Punjabi and ), was a Pakistani politician who served as the 19th Governor of Punjab, Pakistan in 1993 and again from 1994 and 1995. Previously, he had been member of the National Assembly of Pakistan from 1956 to 1958 and again from 1990 to 1993. He was then appointed as Governor of Punjab which he served for three years.

Early life and family
He was born on 28 May 1929 in a political family of Jhelum District to former politician Chaudhry Mohammad Awais. He is the brother of former Chief Justice of Lahore High Court and former federal minister Chaudhry Shahbaz Hussain. His son Chaudhry Farrukh Altaf and nephew Fawad Chaudhry currently serving as member of National Assembly of Pakistan.

Political career
He was first elected to the National Assembly of Pakistan in 1956 which he served till 1958.

He participated in 1970 Pakistani general election from his constituency but defeated.

In 1981, he joined the Muhammad Zia-ul-Haq Majlis-i-Shura and remained a member till 1985.

He again participated in 1985 Pakistani general election as an independent candidate which he lost.

In 1990, he joined Pakistan Peoples Party (PPP). He once again participated in 1990 Pakistani general election as a candidate of Pakistan Peoples Party (PPP) and defeated Raja Mohammad Afzal of the Islami Jamhoori Ittehad (IJI).

In 1993, he was appointed Governor of Punjab, Pakistan where he served till July 1993. He was re-appointed in April 1994 where he remained in office till his death on 21 May 1995.

References

1929 births
1995 deaths
Pakistani MNAs 1955–1958
Pakistani MNAs 1990–1993
Pakistan People's Party MNAs
Governors of Punjab, Pakistan
People from Jhelum District
20th-century Pakistani lawyers
Chaudhry family (Jhelum)
Politicians from Jhelum